Beyak is a surname. Notable people with the surname include:

Dennis Beyak, Canadian sports broadcaster
Lynn Beyak (born 1949), Canadian politician